"Thou shalt not make unto thee any graven image" is an abbreviated form of one of the Ten Commandments which, according to the Book of Deuteronomy, were spoken by God to the Israelites and then written on stone tablets by the Finger of God.  It continues, "... any graven image, or any likeness [of any thing] that [is] in heaven above, or that [is] in the earth beneath, or that [is] in the water under earth: Thou shalt not bow down thyself to them, nor serve them."

Although no single biblical passage contains a complete definition of idolatry, the subject is addressed in numerous passages, so that idolatry may be summarized as the strange worship of idols or images; the worship of polytheistic gods by use of idols or images; the worship of created things (trees, rocks, animals, astronomical bodies, or another human being); and the use of idols in the worship of God (YHWH Elohim, the God of Israel).   Covetousness is forbidden by the 10th commandment, and as greed is defined as idolatry In the New Testament. When the commandment was given, opportunities to participate in the honor or worship of idols abounded, and the religions of Canaanite tribes neighboring the Israelites often centered on a carefully constructed and maintained cult idol. However, according to the book of Deuteronomy, the Israelites were strictly warned to neither adopt nor adapt any of the religious practices of the peoples around them.

Nevertheless, according to the Hebrew Bible the story of the people of Israel until the Babylonian Captivity includes the violation of this commandment as well as the one before it, "Thou shalt have no other gods before me". Much of biblical preaching from the time of Moses to the exile is predicated on the either–or choice between exclusive worship of God and idols. The Babylonian exile seems to have been a turning point after which the Jewish people as a whole were strongly monotheistic and willing to fight battles (such as the Maccabean Revolt) and face martyrdom before paying homage to any other god.

The ancient understanding apparently did not conflict with the artistic rendering of created things, and the Bible describes the Tabernacle, and later the Temple, as having tapestries and objects incorporating cherubim, flowers, fruits, trees, and animals.

However, sometimes objects that God instructed to be made were turned into idols by the Israelites. The Book of Numbers contains a narrative  in which God instructed Moses to make a bronze snake as part of addressing a plague of venomous snakes that had broken out among the Israelites as a punishment for sin. The bronze snake is mentioned again in 2 Kings 18; however, rather than remaining a memorial of God's providence, it became an idol that the people named and worshipped. Thus the bronze snake was destroyed in King Hezekiah's reforms.

According to Exodus 25 and 37, the Ark of the Covenant was a rectangular container overlaid with pure gold with two gold cherubim on its cover. It was considered holy; it was kept in the Holy of Holies, the innermost part of the Tabernacle (and later the Temple), was not to be touched directly, and was only to be transported in a prescribed manner. However, it was not to be an object of worship, and when the Israelites carried it into war like a cult idol, assuming it would guarantee victory, they were defeated, suffering 30,000 casualties, and the Ark was captured and taken to the temple of a foreign god.

Historic violations and prophetic rebukes 
A narrative in 1 Kings 12:28–30 describes how Jeroboam had golden calves made for places of worship at Bethel and Dan. This was done for political purposes, to distance the allegiance of the Israelites from loyalty to worship in Jerusalem, which was in Judah and ruled by King Rehoboam. The text says, "This thing became a sin", and its establishment was accompanied by several related violations of the covenant with God. The language used by Jeroboam to introduce the worship of these idols to Israel was very similar to that used by Aaron with regard to the golden calf at Mount Sinai. The images themselves were reminiscent of Egyptian gods represented by the bull. According to 1 Kings 13, God sends a prophet from Judah to denounce Jeroboam's actions and predict the coming of King Josiah (290 years later), who would destroy those priests who participated in the idolatrous practices.

Not only did the common people substitute Canaanite gods and worship for the worship of the God of Israel, polytheism and worship of foreign gods became virtually official in both the northern and southern kingdoms despite repeated warnings from the prophets of God.

The Book of Kings gives an account of the great 9th-century BC contest at Carmel between Yahweh and Baal regarding control of the rain, and hence of deity: Elijah challenges the Israelites "If Yahweh is God, follow him, but if Baal, then follow him." The people remain ambivalent until the victory of Yahweh is clear, at which point they execute the 450 prophets of Baal said to be present. Although the official, polytheistic policy propelled by King Ahab's wife Jezebel was unchanged in the short term, subsequent text indicates that Ahab later turned away from idols back to Yahweh.

The prophetic books (Nevi'im) recount a continuing struggle against idolatry. For example, the biblical prophet Jeremiah complains: "According to the number of thy cities are thy gods, O Judah." Jeremiah, Ezekiel and Hosea referred to Israel's worship of other gods as spiritual adultery: "How I have been grieved by their adulterous hearts, which have turned away from me, and by their eyes, which have lusted after their idols". This led to a broken covenant between Yahweh and Israel and "divorce", manifested as defeat by King Nebuchadnezzar of Babylon followed by exile, from which the northern kingdom never recovered.

The psalmist described idols as being made of gold, silver, wood, and stone. They are described as being only the work of men's hands, unable to speak, see, hear, smell, eat, grasp, or feel, and powerless either to injure or to benefit. The psalmist, and also the prophet Isaiah, warn that worship of such powerless objects is not harmless, however: "Those who worship them will be like them", that is, unseeing, unfeeling, unable to hear the truth that God would communicate to them.

The Bible presents Daniel and his companions as distinct, positive examples of individuals refusing to pay homage to another god, even at the price of their lives. During the time of the exile, Nebuchadnezzar erects a gold statue of himself and commands all subjects to worship it. Three Jewish officials – Shadrach, Meshach, and Abednego – who had been taken to Babylon as youths along with Daniel, refuse to bow to the statue. As they face being burned alive in a furnace, they communicate their faith as well as their resolve: "If we are thrown into the blazing furnace, the God we serve is able to save us from it, and he will rescue us from your hand, O king. But even if he does not, we want you to know, O king, that we will not serve your gods or worship the image of gold you have set up."

Maccabean revolt

After Antiochus IV Epiphanes recaptured Jerusalem in 167 BC, he forbade Torah and introduced worship of foreign gods into the Second Temple, and many Jews were martyred because they refused to acknowledge the claims of Seleucid deities.

Judaism 

In Judaism, God chooses to reveal his identity, not as an idol or image, but by his words, by his actions in history, and by his working in and through mankind. Idolatry is one of three sins (along with adultery and murder) the Mishnah says must be resisted to the point of death. By the time the Talmud was written, the acceptance or rejection of idolatry was a litmus test for Jewish identity: "Whosoever denies idols is called a Jew". "Whosoever recognizes idols has denied the entire Torah; and whosoever denies idols has recognized the entire Torah." The Talmud discusses the subject of idolatry in many passages. An entire tractate, the Avodah Zarah ("strange worship") details practical guidelines for interacting with surrounding peoples so as to avoid practicing or even indirectly supporting such worship.

In his works, Philo of Alexandria defended the Jewish view of God against both the emperor-worship of the Roman world and the idolatrous worship of animals by the Egyptians.

Maimonedes warned that special objects (such as the mezuzah) and special prayers (such as the shema) are intended to remind people of love for God and his precepts and do not in themselves guarantee good fortune (they are not to become idols).

Although Jews are forbidden in general to mock at anything holy, it is meritorious to deride idols. This apparently originated in ancient times, as some of the several Hebrew words from the Tanakh translated as "idol" are pejorative and even deliberately contemptuous, such as elilim, "powerless ones", and gillulim, "pellets of dung".

Attitudes towards the interpretation of the Commandment changed through the centuries, in that while first century rabbis in Judea objected violently to the depiction of human figures and placement of statues in Temples, third century Babylonian Jews had different views; and while no figural art from first century Roman Judea exists, the art on the Dura synagogue walls developed with no objection from the Rabbis.

Christianity 

Although Jesus discussed the Ten Commandments in the Sermon on the Mount, he did not speak directly of issues regarding the meaning of the commandment against idolatry. According to Acts of the Apostles, the apostles discussed the issue of what immediate behavioral changes would be required of gentiles who became followers of Jesus Christ at the Council of Jerusalem. They decided to instruct new converts: "You are to abstain from food sacrificed to idols, from blood, from the meat of strangled animals and from sexual immorality". In his first letter to the Corinthians, Paul clarified this instruction to counsel converts, who were concerned about the fact that much of the meat sold in the marketplace may have been ritually slaughtered on an idol's altar and/or part of it may have been consumed as an offering to an idol. He condemned attendance at idol feasts, where participation was clearly participation with idolatry. However, Paul advised the Corinthians not to be concerned about meat being sold in the general marketplace or served to them at a meal at which they were a guest – as long as it was not advertised as having been sacrificed to an idol and with consideration not to cause offense to another person's conscience. The language used by Paul in these passages is similar to the first two commandments in regular reference to the jealousy of God, sharp warnings against idolatry and idol images, and the identification of Yahweh as creator and the one who delivered the Israelites from Egypt.

In Athens, Paul was greatly distressed to see that the city was full of idols, and in the Areopagus, he presented the God of Israel as the creator of everything, as unique and not represented by any idol. He taught:

In Ephesus, Paul incurred the wrath of silversmiths (who were worried about losing income from decreased sales of idols) when people responded to his preaching and turned away from idol worship. Paul taught that Christians should actively avoid participating in the worship of anything other than God. He considered it common sense that the worship of God and the worship of any other spiritual being are incompatible:

The New Testament also uses the term "idol" in reference to conceptual constructs, as in Paul's letter to the church in Colosse: "Put to death, therefore, whatever belongs to your earthly nature: sexual immorality, impurity, lust, evil desires and greed which is idolatry." This expands the scope of that which is included in idolatry to certain behaviors and priorities, which capture attention and regard at the expense of that which is owed to God. (See also Thou shalt have no other gods before me.) Paul warned the Galatians that those who live in idolatry "will not inherit the kingdom of God", and in the same passage associates witchcraft with idolatry. In his letter to the Philippians, he refers to those whose "god is their stomach". In several New Testament scriptures, including the Sermon on the Mount, the term 'idolatry' is applied to the love of money. The apostle James rebukes those who focus on material things, using language similar to that of Old Testament prophets: "When you ask [in prayer], you do not receive, because you ask with wrong motives, that you may spend what you get on your pleasures. You adulterous people, don't you know that friendship with the world is hatred toward God? Anyone who chooses to be a friend of the world becomes an enemy of God".
 
Paul commended the church in Thessalonica saying, "Your faith in God has become known everywhere ... They tell how you turned to God from idols to serve the living and true God, and to wait for his Son from heaven, whom he raised from the dead—Jesus, who rescues us from the coming wrath." Paul identifies the worship of created things (rather than the Creator) as the cause of the disintegration of sexual and social morality in his letter to the Romans. The apostle Peter and the Book of Revelation also refer to the connection between the worship of other gods and sexual sins, whether metaphorically or literally.

The apostle John wrote simply, "Dear children, keep yourselves from idols".

Catholicism 

Because God's identity and transcendent character are described in Scripture as unique, the teaching of the Catholic Church proscribes superstition as well as irreligion and explains the commandment is broken by having images to which divine power is ascribed as well as in divinizing anything that is not God. "Man commits idolatry whenever he honors and reveres a creature in place of God, whether this be gods or demons ... power, pleasure, race, ancestors, the state, money, etc.". The Catholic Church teaches that idolatry extends beyond the worship of images of other gods. "Idolatry rejects the unique Lordship of God; it is therefore incompatible with communion with God". The Catechism commends those who refuse even to simulate such worship in a cultural context and states that "the duty to offer God authentic worship concerns man both as an individual and as a social being".

The Catechism of the Catholic Church notes that this commandment is recalled many times throughout the Bible and quotes passages describing temporal consequences for those who place trust elsewhere than in God:

In his exposition of Psalm 96, Augustine of Hippo agreed with the psalmist's description of inanimate idols, and he recalled Paul's words to the Corinthians that sacrifices to such are offered to demons. Rather than alternate deities condemned by monotheism, these demons are portrayed by Augustine as malevolent beings seeking not to rule as much as to seduce people into sharing eternal punishment, much as a twisted criminal might implicate an innocent person to feed his own malevolence.

Anthony of Padua, seeking to reform the inordinate desire for money he observed in some priests, compared to idols those priests who bought and sold offices and abandoned their flocks, using the language of the psalmist and Isaiah to describe them as having eyes but not seeing, having feet but not walking.

Protestantism 
John Calvin, a prolific and influential Reformation scholar, took a straightforward view of idolatry, patterned after the simplicity of the faith of the early apostles:

 
John Wesley preached on the text of the Apostle John: "Dear children, keep yourselves from idols." He thought that John was not referring to idols of the religions around Israel, since through the Babylonian Captivity, a deep abhorrence of such was in the Jewish people and would have been understood by converts. By idols, Wesley interpreted this verse to mean any thing or priority to which one's heart is given rather than to God. He notes that the Apostle John often encouraged love among Christians and realized that it must first be founded on love of God, which is only possible by being separate from the worship of idols:

Martin Luther taught that whatever a person places their trust or priorities in, other than God, can become an idol. Rather than scorn the Israelites for falling into the worship of idols, Luther commented that people are spiritual beings, who know there is a divine authority and easily fall into idolatry because of our fallen nature. Knowing truth from idolatry, he explained, depends on the Bible, for without paying attention to the Word of God, people make up God's characteristics to believe that God is in agreement "with such works and worshippings as your devotion and good intention make choice of".

See also
 Cult image
 Icon
 Murti
 Shirk (Islam)
 Aniconism
Aniconism in Christianity
Aniconism in Islam

References

External links 
 Worship, Idol entry at JewishEncyclopedia.com
 Overview of the Halacha based on Maimonides' Mishneh Torah Idolatry and the Customs of the Nations
 Noahide Laws
 Definition of idolatry according to Merriam-Webster Dictionary
 The Second Commandment Including passages from Exodus and Deuteronomy in Masoretic Hebrew, Septuagint Greek and several English translations.
 Aseret Hadiberot The Second Commandment

Idolatry
Biblical phrases
Ten Commandments